Shuyang Economic and Technological Development Zone (沭阳经济技术开发区) is an area of the Shuyang County, Jiangsu Province, China. It is one of China National Economic and Technological Development Zones with an area of 24.5 km2.

History
Founded in August 2001, the Shuyang Economic Development Zone is a significant portion in the industrial sector of Shuyang. In December 2013, it has been upgraded to one of China National Economic and Technological Development Zones and the name of the development zone has been changed to Shuyang Economic and Technological Development Zone (SETDZ).

Industry
SETDZ is noted for the machinery, advanced materials, electronic systems and software. There are over 400 enterprises in SETDZ and most of them are invested by domestic capital.

More than 9 billion RMB has been spent on infrastructure within the zone and it mainly collected from the private sector. According to the statistics in 2011, SETDZ created a GDP of 5 billion RMB.

Nowadays, the performance of SETDZ-owned industry is getting stronger as a considerable number of enterprises controlled by SETDZers are approaching a high level.

30,000 KW thermal station in East Hangzhou Road is the main supplier of SETDZ..

Geography
SETDZ was located to the east of Shuyang's urban area. As the expansion of the city, SETDZ has surrounded by the metropolitan area from 2005. Critics believe SETDZ is the main polluter to the city.

References

Shuyang County
Special Economic Zones of China